Harley is a township in the Canadian province of Ontario. Located within the Timiskaming District, Harley is located directly north of the city of Temiskaming Shores.

It is believed to be named in honour of Archibald Harley, former Member of Parliament for Oxford South.

Arnold Peters, a Member of Parliament from 1957 to 1980, was born in Uno Park.

Communities
The township's main settlement is the community of Hanbury. The ghost town of Uno Park is also located within the township.

History
In 1896, the township was opened up for settlement. Settlers arrived first by boat on the Wabi Creek and later on via the North Dymond and Harley Road (since 1937 known as Highway 11). It was incorporated in 1904.

Initially the land was covered with spruce, tamarack, cedar, and poplar, that supported a thriving lumber industry. Having been cleared of most forests, Harley's main economic activity shifted to agriculture.

Demographics 

Mother tongue (2006):
 English as first language: 60.5%
 French as first language: 39.5%
 English and French as first language: 0%
 Other as first language: 0%

See also
List of townships in Ontario
List of francophone communities in Ontario

References

External links

 Official website

Municipalities in Timiskaming District
Single-tier municipalities in Ontario
Township municipalities in Ontario